Mumbai Indians (MI) are a franchise cricket team based in Mumbai, India, which plays in the Indian Premier League (IPL). They were one of the ten teams that took part in the 2011 Indian Premier League. They were captained by Sachin Tendulkar for the fourth season in succession.

Mumbai Indians reached the Qualifier of playoff stage in the 2011 IPL where they were defeated by the Royal Challengers Bangalore. They qualified for the 2011 Champions League Twenty20, where they emerged as champions.

Indian Premier League

Squad

Match log

Champions League Twenty20

Match log

References

2011 Indian Premier League
Mumbai Indians seasons